Gana El Maghnaoui  (Arabic قانا المغناوي), born 2 February 1958, is an Algerian raï songwriter, lyricist and composer.

Biography
From Maghnia (Tlemcen Province), Mourad Gana, better known under the name Gana El Maghnaoui, was born 2 February 1958 in Maghnia, Algeria. As a musician, he plays the violin as well as the trumpet. His debut in rai music dates back to 1973. He was part of the orchestra of the Oran section of the RTA (1974–1980), then in Algiers. In 1978, he released two EPs and a year later he recorded an 8 track cassette. Noting that it didn't work, he disappeared and resumed in 1986 with the hit Ala ezzergha rani nsel and a cover of Bouteldja Belkacem Milouda fine Kunti, the hit of the year.

Discography
EP with Boussouar el Maghnaoui (El Anwar, 1977)
Dayak oulabasse / Salamate salamate with Bellemou Messaoud (El Mehar, 1978)
Self-titled cassette n. 736 (El Anwar, 1978)
Self-titled cassette n. 737 (El Anwar, 1978)
Self-titled cassette n. 822 (El Anwar, 1978)
Self-titled cassette (Bouarfa, 1978)
Ha Lamane (CADIC, 1987)
Best Of (SOLI, 1990s)
Le roi de la trompette with Messaoud Bellemou (1996)

Songs
Ala ezzergha rani nsel
Latamen fi saheb
Milouda fine Kunti
Farchili Rani Âyane
Sid taleb

References

External links
 

1958 births
Living people
Raï musicians
Algerian songwriters
Algerian composers
People from Maghnia
Algerian trumpeters
Algerian violinists
20th-century trumpeters
20th-century violinists
20th-century composers
20th-century Algerian musicians
20th-century male musicians
21st-century trumpeters
21st-century violinists
21st-century composers
21st-century Algerian musicians
21st-century male musicians
Male trumpeters
Male violinists
Male composers
Algerian male musicians